Conspiracy is a 2000 Hong Kong sex film directed by Shu-Pui Hou and produced by Chun Fai Lau, starring Bessie Chan, Simon Lui, Michael Tse, Sophie Ngan, Peter Lai, and Gai-keung Si. The film premiered in Hong Kong on 6 July 2000.

Cast
 Bessie Chan as Maggie To.
 Simon Lui as Ken Chow.
 Michael Tse as Andy Yeung.
 Sophie Ngan as Sharon Li.
 Peter Lai as Police chief.
 Gai-keung Si as Policeman.
 Tao Chiang as Sam Tsu.
 Feng Ku as Wilson Koo.

Release
It was released in Hong Kong on 6 July 2000, and grossed HK$17,250.

References

External links

Hong Kong erotic films
2000s Mandarin-language films
2000s Hong Kong films